Arundel Mills is a shopping mall located in unincorporated Anne Arundel County, Maryland (with a Hanover mailing address). It is 59.3% owned by Simon Property Group, who manages the mall. With its  GLA, it is the largest mall in the state of Maryland. Developed by The Mills Corporation, the mall is located at the intersection of Maryland Route 100 and the Baltimore-Washington Parkway (Maryland Route 295) in northwestern Anne Arundel County (hence the name "Arundel" Mills). The anchor stores are Cinemark Theatres, Books-A-Million, The Children's Place, TJ Maxx, Burlington, Off Broadway Shoe Warehouse, Sun and Ski Sports, Old Navy, MD Furniture, Bass Pro Shops, Saks Fifth Avenue, Ulta Beauty, Dave & Buster's, Yard House, and Primark (opening 2023).

Arundel Mills opened in November 2000 and, as of July 21, 2007, had over 225 stores. It is the first enclosed mall to feature a Medieval Times dinner theater. In addition to 17 large anchor stores, Arundel Mills features a Dave & Buster's, the Live! Casino & Hotel, and an Egyptian-themed 24-screen megaplex theater. The cinema was the only outlet of its Muvico Theaters chain in the state of Maryland before being sold to Cinemark in March 2009.

The mall's interior layout features a "racetrack" design and, more noticeably, the outline of a boat. Sponsorships for five sections or "neighborhoods" of the mall were previously held by Coca-Cola, Comcast, Discover Card, The Baltimore Sun, and Toyota.

Anchor and department stores
As of May 2022, the mall's anchor and department stores include Bass Pro Shops Outdoor World, Books-A-Million, Burlington Coat Factory, The Children's Place, Cinemark Egyptian 24 Theatres, Dave & Buster's, Forever 21, H&M, MD Furniture, Medieval Times Dinner & Tournament, OFF 5th Saks Fifth Avenue Outlet, Sun and Ski Sports, T.J. Maxx, and Ulta Beauty.

Live! Casino & Hotel

After Maryland voters approved slot machine gambling in Maryland in 2008, The Cordish Company planned a slots parlor next to the mall. The proposal for slots at Arundel Mills was on the ballot as a referendum in the November 2010 elections; the referendum passed, and construction began on the casino shortly afterward, with the grand opening of its first phase held on June 6, 2012. Since full completion in September 2012, Live! Casino & Hotel has about 380,000 sq. ft. of floor space and 4,750 gaming slots. Live! Casino & Hotel is a free-standing facility, separated from Arundel Mills by the inner mall ring road. Although not directly connected to the mall, the casino is within walking distance of the food court entrance. Live! Casino & Hotel includes a 5,000-space parking structure at Arundel Mills with a "smart park" green-and-red-light space availability feature, such as the system used at nearby BWI Airport. Parking is available free of charge during all mall hours for Arundel Mills shoppers.

Live! Casino & Hotel includes several dining options, including Bobby's Burger Palace; The Cheesecake Factory; and a Prime Rib steakhouse. The project was to feature an Obrycki's Crab House and Seafood Restaurant, though the restaurant announced in November 2011 that it would not be opening a location there. Instead, Phillips Seafood opened a location at the site. Live! Casino & Hotel has a live music venue, operated by Annapolis-based Rams Head, which includes fixed seating for approximately 300 in a cabaret-style design with several stepped viewing levels of the stage.

In 2019, The Hall! At Live! concert venue officially opened.

The hotel itself has a restaurant, spa, salon, gift shop, and meeting rooms open to the public. Anne Arundel Community College holds their annual graduation at Live!.

References

External links

  Official website.
  Official website.
 
 Simon Property Group

Buildings and structures in Anne Arundel County, Maryland
Shopping malls in Maryland
Shopping malls established in 2000
Simon Property Group
Outlet malls in the United States
Tourist attractions in Anne Arundel County, Maryland
2000 establishments in Maryland